Johann-Hermann Meier (10 June 1921 – 15 March 1944) was a German Luftwaffe military aviator during World War II, a fighter ace credited with 77 enemy aircraft shot down in 305 combat missions. All of his victories were claimed over the Eastern Front.

On 15 March 1944, Meier was killed in a takeoff accident after his Focke-Wulf Fw 190 collided with another Fw 190 while taxiing at the Luftwaffe base in Florennes, Belgium. He was posthumously awarded the Knight's Cross of the Iron Cross on 16 December 1944.

Career
On 12 October 1942, Meier was posted to 1. Staffel (1st squadron) of Jagdgeschwader 52 (JG 52—52nd Fighter Wing) fighting on the Eastern Front. At the time, his commanding officer of 1. Staffel was Oberleutnant Friedrich Bartels while the Gruppe was headed by Hauptmann Helmut Bennemann.

On 10 June 1943, the Staffelkapitän (squadron leader) of 3. Staffel of JG 52 was killed in action. In consequence, Meier was transferred from 1. Staffel and temporarily given command of 3. Staffel until Hauptmann Erich Schreiber assumed command on 15 July.

With Jagdgeschwader 26 "Schlageter" and death
Meier was transferred to I. Gruppe of Jagdgeschwader 26 "Schlageter" (JG 26–26th Fighter Wing) in February 1944 fighting on the Western Front flying the Focke-Wulf Fw 190 fighter. At the time, the Gruppe was based at Florennes Airfield and commanded by Hauptmann Karl Borris. There, Meier was appointed Staffelkapitän (squadron leader) of 1. Staffel on 29 February. He replaced Leutnant Leberecht Altmann who was transferred.

On 15 March, the United States Army Air Forces attacked Braunschweig with a force of Boeing B-17 Flying Fortress and Consolidated B-24 Liberator bombers. Defending against this attack, I. and II. Gruppe of JG 26 was scrambled. During takeoff, Meier in his Fw 190 A-6 (Werknummer 470057–factory number) collided with his wingman Unteroffizier Hans Ruppert. Both aircraft caught fire, while Ruppert escaped, Meier was killed in the accident. According to an eyewitness report, Meier was drunk at the time. For his 77 aerial victories claimed with JG 52, Meier was awarded a posthumous Knight's Cross of the Iron Cross. Meier was succeeded by Oberleutnant Kurt Kranefeld as Staffelkapitän of 1. Staffel.

Summary of career

Aerial victory claims
According to Spick, Meier was credited with 77 aerial victories, 76 of which on the Eastern Front and one on the Western Front, claimed in 305 combat missions. Mathews and Foreman, authors of Luftwaffe Aces: Biographies and Victory Claims, researched the German Federal Archives and found records for 76 aerial victory claims, all of which were claimed on the Eastern Front.

Victory claims were logged to a map-reference (PQ = Planquadrat), for example "PQ 62322". These sectors were then subdivided into 36 smaller units to give a location area 3 × 4 km in size.

Awards
 Flugzeugführerabzeichen
 Front Flying Clasp of the Luftwaffe
 Honour Goblet of the Luftwaffe on 13 September 1941 as Leutnant and pilot
 Iron Cross (1939) 2nd and 1st Class
 German Cross in Gold on 27 October 1943 as Leutnant in the I./Jagdgeschwader 52
 Knight's Cross of the Iron Cross on 16 December 1944 as Leutnant and Staffelführer of the 1./Jagdgeschwader 26 "Schlageter"

Notes

References

Citations

Bibliography

1921 births
1944 deaths
Aviators killed in aviation accidents or incidents in France
German World War II flying aces
Luftwaffe pilots
People from Dithmarschen
People from the Province of Schleswig-Holstein
Recipients of the Gold German Cross
Recipients of the Knight's Cross of the Iron Cross
Military personnel from Schleswig-Holstein